Music From and Inspired by the Motion Picture xXx: A New Breed of Secret Agent is the film soundtrack to the film xXx. It was released on August 6, 2002, via Universal Music Group as a two-disc set. The first disc is composed of a blend of alternative rock, nu metal and techno music. The second disc, entitled The Xander Xone, contains ten tracks of hip hop music. Production was handled by Kathy Nelson, Neal H. Moritz and Rob Cohen with executive producer Avery Lipman.

The album peaked at #8 in Austria, #9 in the United States, #12 in New Zealand, #24 in Australia and Germany. It was certified Gold by the Recording Industry Association of America on September 16, 2002, 2× Platinum by the Music Canada (200,000 copies) on April 11, 2003 and Gold by the Asociación Mexicana de Productores de Fonogramas y Videogramas on July 28, 2003.

Track listing

Disc 1 

Notes
The Canadian release featured an additional track "Juicy" by I Mother Earth, which was added too late to be included on the American release. The Australia/Germany/New Zealand release featured the track "Me vs. Me" by 4Lyn as the 11th track and consequently omitted "Connected for Life" from the Xander Xone.

Disc 2

Charts

Weekly charts

Year-end charts

Certifications

Other information
Gavin Rossdale's "Adrenaline" peaked at #20 on the Billboard Modern Rock Tracks chart and #24 on its Mainstream Rock Tracks chart.
It was used as the official theme song for WWE 2002 Unforgiven pay-per-view event.

References

External links

XXX (film series)
2002 soundtrack albums
Hip hop soundtracks
Alternative rock soundtracks
Universal Records soundtracks
Albums produced by Moby
Albums produced by Matt Hyde
Albums produced by Timbaland
Albums produced by Josh Homme
Albums produced by Glen Ballard
Albums produced by Mannie Fresh
Albums produced by the Neptunes
Albums produced by David Bottrill
Albums produced by Eric Valentine
Albums produced by Jay Baumgardner
Albums produced by Bink (record producer)
Action film soundtracks